Rollins Air was an airline charter company based in Honduras. It had Lockheed Tristars and Boeing 737s. In 2011 it was banned from operating in the European Union due to safety concerns. On 24 September 2012, its AOC (Air Operator's Certificate) was revoked and it subsequently expired.  On 4 December 2012 (after the AOC expired) the airline was removed from EU list of banned air carriers.

On 24 November 1997 a GAF Nomad N.24A was damaged beyond repair on landing, but no one was killed.

Their charter flights were flying to Europe and Africa, and were used for pilgrimage to Mecca.

References

Defunct airlines of Honduras